Clothing in ancient Greece primarily consisted of the chiton, peplos, himation, and chlamys. Ancient Greek civilians typically wore two pieces of clothing draped about the body: an undergarment ( : chitōn or  : péplos) and a cloak ( : himátion or  : chlamýs). 

Ancient Greek clothing was mainly based on necessity, function, materials, and protection rather than identity. Thus, clothes were quite simple, draped, loose-fitting and free-flowing. Customarily, clothing was homemade and cut to various lengths of rectangular linen or wool fabric with minimal cutting or sewing, and secured with ornamental clasps or pins, and a belt, or girdle (: zōnē). 

Pieces were generally interchangeable between men and women. However, women usually wore their robes to their ankles while men generally wore theirs to their knees depending on the occasion and circumstance.

While no clothes have survived from this period, descriptions exist in contemporary accounts and artistic depictions. Clothes were mainly homemade or locally made. Additionally, clothing often served many purposes (such as bedding). All ancient Greek clothing was made out of natural fibers. Linen was the most common fabric due to the hot climate which lasted most of the year. On the rare occasion of colder weather, ancient Greeks wore wool. 

Common clothing of the time was plain white, or neutral-colored, sometimes incorporating decorative borders. There is evidence of elaborate design and bright colors, but these were less common among lower-class citizens. However, noble citizens wore bright colors to express their wealth as dyed clothing was more expensive. The clothing for both men and women generally consisted of two main parts: a tunic and a cloak. They didn't start sewing and making actual clothes until the 4th century.

The Greeks had a great appreciation for the human body, and it was shown in their fashion. The fabric was expertly draped around the body, and the cloth could be slightly transparent. Males had no problem with nudity, while women could only be naked in the public bath. They typically wore purple as a sign of wealth and money as it was the most expensive dye to get hold of.

History and types

Garment

Chitonh

The chiton was a simple tunic garment of lighter linen and usually pleated that was worn by both sexes and all ages. It consisted of a wide, rectangular tube of material secured along the shoulders and lower arms by a series of fasteners. Chitons typically fell to the ankles of the wearer, but shorter chitons were sometimes worn during vigorous activities by athletes, warriors, or slaves.

Often excess fabric would be pulled over a girdle, or belt, which was fastened around the waist (see kolpos). To deal with the bulk sometimes a strap, or anamaschalister was worn around the neck, brought under the armpits, crossed in the back, and tied in the front. A himation, or cloak, could be worn over-top of the chiton.

There are two types of chitons – Doric and Ionic, named for their similarities to the Doric and Ionic columns. The Doric chiton is "sleeveless", as sleeve technology had not been created yet. Much like that on the caryatid above, the Doric chiton has a fold over at the top or Apoptygma, is attached with fibulae at the shoulders, and is belted at the waist. Unlike the Doric Chiton, the Ionic chiton doesn't have an Apoptygma and is a long enough rectangle of fabric that when folded in half can complete a wingspan. Before shaped sleeve patterns existed the Greeks attached fibulae (ancient Greek safety pins) all the way up both arms to join the front and back top edges of the fabric. The Ionic chiton was also belted at the waist. The Doric chiton was usually made of wool and the Ionic chiton was usually made of linen.

Chitoniskos
Chitoniskos (χιτωνίσκος), was a short chiton sometimes worn over another chiton.

Chiridota
Chiridota (singular χειριδωτός, plural χειριδωτοί), were tunics with sleeves.

Peplos

A predecessor to the himation, the peplos was a square piece of cloth that was originally worn over the chiton by women. The top third of the cloth was folded over and pinned at both shoulders, leaving the cloth open down one side. This upper part of the peplos which is folded down to the waist, forms an Apoptygma. Sometimes the peplos was worn alone as an alternative form of chiton. As with the chiton, often a girdle or belt would be used to fasten the folds at the waist.

Himation

The himation was a simple outer garment worn over the peplos or chiton. It consisted of heavy rectangular material, passing under the left arm and secured at the right shoulder. The cloak would be twisted around a strap that also passed under the left arm and over the right shoulder. A more voluminous himation was worn in cold weather.

The himation could be pulled up over the head to cover the wearer when they were overcome by emotion or shame.

Epiblema
The epiblema (ἐπίβλημα) was large cloak or mantle that was wrapped around the body.

Exomis
The exomis was a tunic which left the right arm and shoulder bare. It was worn by slaves and the working classes. In addition, it was worn by some units of light infantry.

Encomboma
The encomboma (ἐγκόμβωμα) was an upper garment tied round the body in a knot (κόμβος), whence the name, and worn to keep the tunic clean.

Chlamys
The chlamys was a seamless rectangle of woolen material worn by men for military or hunting purposes. It was worn as a cloak and fastened at the right shoulder with a brooch or button.

The chlamys was typical Greek military attire from the 5th to the 3rd century BC.

Thessalian chlamys had a small flap on each side which resemble wings, because of that there was the proverbial phrase Thessalian wings (Θετταλικαὶ πτέρυγες).

Allix
Allix (Ἄλλικα) and Gallix (Γάλλικά) was a chlamys according to Thessalians.

Egkuklon and Tougkuklon
Egkuklon (Ἔγκυκλον) and Tougkuklon (Τοὔγκυκλον) were woman's upper garment.

Katonake
Katonake (Κατωνάκη), it was a cloak which had a fleece (nakos) hanging from the lower (kato) parts, that is a wrapped-around hide and stretched down to the knees.

Kolobus
Kolobus or Kolobium (Κολόβιον) was like a Tunic but sleeveless.

Krokotos
Krokotos (Κροκωτός) was a saffron-coloured robe/chiton.

Diphthera
Diphthera (Διφθέρα) (meaning leather), a shepherd's wrap made of hides.

Phoinikis
Phoinikis (Φοινικὶς) was a military chlamys.

Sisura
Sisura (Σισύρα or Σίσυρα) or Sisurna (Σίσυρνα), type of inexpensive cloak/mantle, like a one-shoulder tunic.

Tebennos
Tebennos (Τήβεννος) and Tebenneion (Tηβέννειον), a garment like Toga.

Chlaina
Chlaina (Χλαῖνα) or Chlaine (Χλαῖνη), was a thick overgarment/coat. It was laid over the shoulders unfolded (ἁπλοΐς; haploís) or double-folded (δίπλαξ; díplax) with a pin.

Tribon
Tribon (Τρίβων), simple cloak. It was worn by Spartan men and was the favorite garment of the Cynic philosophers

Spolas
Spolas (Σπολάς), a leather cloak, perhaps being worn on top.

Dalmatica
Dalmatica (Δαλματική) or Delmatica (Δελματική), a tunic with long sleeves, introduced from Dalmatia.

Ampechone
Ampechone (ἀμπεχόνη, ἀμπέχονον, ἀμπεχόνιον), was a shawl or scarf worn by women over the chiton or inner garment.

Undergarments

Women often wore a strophic, the bra of the time, under their garments and around the mid-portion of their body. The strophic was a wide band of wool or linen wrapped across the breasts and tied between the shoulder blades. 

Men and women sometimes wore triangular loincloths, called perizoma, as underwear.

Fasteners, buttons
Since clothing was rarely cut or sewn, fasteners and buttons were often used to keep garments in place. Small buttons, pins, and brooches were used.

Large pins, called peronai and also fibulae, were worn at the shoulders, facing down, to hold the chiton or peplos in place.

Belts, sashes, or girdles were also worn at the waist sometimes replacing fasteners/buttons. Cestus was a girdle or belt worn by women.

Footwear

Men and women typically wore slippers, sandals, shoes with a soft liner or boots. At home, they were typically barefoot.

There were three main kinds of footwear:
 sandals
 shoes which partially covered the feet
 boots which fully covered the feet

The Athenian general Iphicrates, made soldiers' boots that were easy to untie and light. These boots called afterwards, from his name, Iphicratids.

Crepida (Κρηπίς), was a kind of shoe between a closed boot and plain sandals.

The bodyguards of the Peisistratid tyrants were called wolf-feet (Λυκόποδες). According to one theory, they were called like this because they had their feet covered with wolf-skins, to prevent frostbites.

Embas (ἐμβάς) and Embates (ἐμβάτης), was a closed boot.

Arbele (ἀρβύλη) meant "half-boot".

Kroupezai (κρούπεζαι), Kroupezia (κρουπέζια) and Kroupala (κρούπαλα) were wooden shoes worn by peasants and took their names from noise which they made. Photius wrote that they were used for treading out olives.

Headgear
Kredemnon (κρήδεμνον) was a woman's headdress or veil of uncertain form, a sort of covering for the head with lappets hanging down to the shoulders on both sides, and when drawn together concealing the face.

Ampyx (ἄμπυχ) was a headband worn by Greek women to confine the hair, passing round the front of the head and fastening behind. It appears generally to have consisted of a plate of gold or silver, often richly worked and adorned with precious stones.

Jewelry
Ornamentation in the form of jewelry, elaborate hairstyles, and make-up was common for women. Small gold ornaments would be sewn onto their clothing and would glitter as they moved. The Greeks had rings, wreaths, diadems, bracelets, armbands, pins, pendants, necklaces, and earrings. Popular earring designs included: flying gods and goddesses, like Eros, Nike, and Ganymede. Patterns such as the meander symbolizing eternity were also commonly engraved into jewelry. Gold and silver were the most common mediums for jewelry. However, jewelry from this time could also have pearls, gems, and semiprecious stones used as decoration. Jewelry was commonly passed down from generation to generation or made as an offering to the gods.

Fabrics

Ancient Greek clothing was made with silk, linen and wool. However, linen was the most common fiber due to the hot climate. The production of fabric was a long, tedious, and expensive process. It was socially accepted that textile making was primarily women's responsibility, and the production of high-quality textiles was regarded as an accomplishment for women of high status. 

The most expensive textiles were finely woven linen and very soft wool. Expensive linen was sheer; nudity was not taboo in Ancient Greece. Less expensive and more commonly used textiles were linens woven from flax soaked in olive oil and coarse wool. 

Once made, the cloth was rarely cut. The seamless rectangles of fabric were draped on the body in various ways with little sewing involved. The fabric could be crinkled or pleated to give the garment more fullness, as the more fabric one wore, the wealthier they appeared. 

Another way of showing wealth was to use colorful dyes. Some assume that the Greeks wore only white because the recovered statues from this time showed white drapery. However, the artwork had originally been painted and that the garments the Greeks wore were actually quite colorful (see Gods in Color). Common dye colors included green, brown, grey, and yellow, while Tyrian purple dye was expensive to produce and only worn by the wealthy.

See also 
Greek dress
Biblical clothing
Clothing in ancient Rome
Clothing in the ancient world
Kausia
Petasos
Kandys

References

External links 

 Ancient Greek Clothing
 Harry Thurston Peck, Harpers Dictionary of Classical Antiquities (1898), Clothing

Garment
 Harry Thurston Peck, Harpers Dictionary of Classical Antiquities (1898), Abolla
 A Dictionary of Greek and Roman Antiquities (1890), Ephestris
 A Dictionary of Greek and Roman Antiquities (1890), Epiblema
 A Dictionary of Greek and Roman Antiquities (1890), Amictus
 A Dictionary of Greek and Roman Antiquities (1890), Pallium
 A Dictionary of Greek and Roman Antiquities (1890), Palla
 A Dictionary of Greek and Roman Antiquities (1890), Paludamentum
 A Dictionary of Greek and Roman Antiquities (1890), Cingulum
 A Dictionary of Greek and Roman Antiquities (1890), Mitra
 A Dictionary of Greek and Roman Antiquities (1890), Dalmatica
 A Dictionary of Greek and Roman Antiquities (1890), Tunica
 A Dictionary of Greek and Roman Antiquities (1890), Laena
 A Dictionary of Greek and Roman Antiquities (1890), Lacerna
 A Dictionary of Greek and Roman Antiquities (1890), Cucullus
 A Dictionary of Greek and Roman Antiquities (1890), Cyclas

Footwear
 A Dictionary of Greek and Roman Antiquities (1890), Calceus
 Harry Thurston Peck, Harpers Dictionary of Classical Antiquities (1898), Calceus
 Harry Thurston Peck, Harpers Dictionary of Classical Antiquities (1898), Carbatina
 A Dictionary of Greek and Roman Antiquities (1890), Crepida
 Harry Thurston Peck, Harpers Dictionary of Classical Antiquities (1898), Crepida
 Harry Thurston Peck, Harpers Dictionary of Classical Antiquities (1898), Cothurnus
 Harry Thurston Peck, Harpers Dictionary of Classical Antiquities (1898), Caliga
 Harry Thurston Peck, Harpers Dictionary of Classical Antiquities (1898), Baucides
 A Dictionary of Greek and Roman Antiquities (1890), Baucides
 A Dictionary of Greek and Roman Antiquities (1890), Baxeae
 Harry Thurston Peck, Harpers Dictionary of Classical Antiquities (1898), Baxeae
 Harry Thurston Peck, Harpers Dictionary of Classical Antiquities (1898), Embas
 A Dictionary of Greek and Roman Antiquities (1890), Embas
 Harry Thurston Peck, Harpers Dictionary of Classical Antiquities (1898), Endromis
 Harry Thurston Peck, Harpers Dictionary of Classical Antiquities (1898), Soccus
 Harry Thurston Peck, Harpers Dictionary of Classical Antiquities (1898), Solea
 Harry Thurston Peck, Harpers Dictionary of Classical Antiquities (1898), Talaria
 Harry Thurston Peck, Harpers Dictionary of Classical Antiquities (1898), Zancha
 Harry Thurston Peck, Harpers Dictionary of Classical Antiquities (1898), Fulmenta
 Harry Thurston Peck, Harpers Dictionary of Classical Antiquities (1898), Gallicae
 Harry Thurston Peck, Harpers Dictionary of Classical Antiquities (1898), Ligula
 Harry Thurston Peck, Harpers Dictionary of Classical Antiquities (1898), Obstragulum
 Harry Thurston Peck, Harpers Dictionary of Classical Antiquities (1898), Phaecasium
 Harry Thurston Peck, Harpers Dictionary of Classical Antiquities (1898), Sandalium

Other
 A Dictionary of Greek and Roman Antiquities (1890), Strophium
 A Dictionary of Greek and Roman Antiquities (1890), Ampyx
 A Dictionary of Greek and Roman Antiquities (1890), Calautica
 A Dictionary of Greek and Roman Antiquities (1890), Armilla
 A Dictionary of Greek and Roman Antiquities (1890), Inauris
 A Dictionary of Greek and Roman Antiquities (1890), Manica
 A Dictionary of Greek and Roman Antiquities (1890), Nodus
 A Dictionary of Greek and Roman Antiquities (1890), Bulla
 A Dictionary of Greek and Roman Antiquities (1890), Amuletum
 A Dictionary of Greek and Roman Antiquities (1890), Fibula
 Harry Thurston Peck, Harpers Dictionary of Classical Antiquities (1898), Caliendrum
 Harry Thurston Peck, Harpers Dictionary of Classical Antiquities (1898), Redimiculum

See also

Hairstyles
 Harry Thurston Peck, Harpers Dictionary of Classical Antiquities (1898), Cincinnus
 Harry Thurston Peck, Harpers Dictionary of Classical Antiquities (1898), Coma

History of clothing